The Hienderstock (named Hühnerstock on the Siegfried Map) is a mountain in the Bernese Alps, located between the Gauli Glacier and the Unteraar Glacier, in the canton of Bern. Its main summit has an elevation of 3,307 metres above sea level.

References

External links
Hienderstock on Hikr

Mountains of the Alps
Alpine three-thousanders
Mountains of Switzerland
Mountains of the canton of Bern